Naltar Pass is a mountain pass to the north of Shani Peak in Naltar Valley in Pakistan. The pass lies west of Chaprot Pass and east of Hayal Pass.

See also
Naltar Valley

References

External links
 Northern Pakistan detailed placemarks in Google Earth

Mountain passes of Gilgit-Baltistan